Torhild Johnsen (born 14 August 1934) is a Norwegian politician for the Christian Democratic Party.

She served as a deputy representative to the Norwegian Parliament from Østfold during the term 1981–1985.

On the local level Johnsen was the mayor of Halden municipality from 2001 to 2003.

References

1934 births
Living people
Deputy members of the Storting
Christian Democratic Party (Norway) politicians
Mayors of places in Østfold
Women mayors of places in Norway
20th-century Norwegian women politicians
20th-century Norwegian politicians
Women members of the Storting